Ozolsala Station was a railway station on the Riga – Daugavpils Railway.

The station had two semi elevated platforms, and the stop has 2 tracks, and no turnouts. 

In December of 2019, along with 7 other stations on the Latvian Railway network, this station was closed, and no more trains stop at the Ozolsala Stop.

References 

Railway stations in Latvia
Railway stations opened in 1942